Chaman Soltan (also Romanized as Chaman Solţān, Chaman-i-Sultān, and Chaman Sultān; also known as Cham Solţān) is a village in Borborud-e Sharqi Rural District, in the Central District of Aligudarz County, Lorestan Province, Iran. At the 2006 census, its population was 2,483, in 571 families, making it the most populous village in Aligudarz County.

References 

Towns and villages in Aligudarz County